Alexander Guskov (born November 26, 1976) is a Russian former professional ice hockey defenceman. He was selected by the Columbus Blue Jackets in the 7th round (200th overall) of the 2003 NHL Entry Draft.

Between 2007 and 2017 he played for multiple teams in the Russian Super League and then the Kontinental Hockey League.

Career statistics

Regular season and playoffs

International

References

External links

Living people
Lokomotiv Yaroslavl players
1976 births
Columbus Blue Jackets draft picks
Russian ice hockey defencemen